Johnson is a masculine given name which may refer to:

 Johnson Bademosi (born 1990), American football player
 Johnson N. Camden (1828–1908), US Senator from West Virginia
 Johnson N. Camden Jr. (1865–1942), US Senator from Kentucky, son of the above
 Johnson Charles (born 1989), West Indies cricketer
 Johnson Hagood (1829–1898), Confederate Army brigadier general and 80th Governor of South Carolina, uncle of the above
 Johnson Hagood (1873–1948), US Army major general
 Johnson Macaba (born 1978), Angolan footballer
 Johnson C. Smith (1844–1919), American businessman

English masculine given names